On Air was a broker airline based in Pescara, Italy. It started operations in 2006 and operated international services within Europe using wet leased aircraft, mainly from Blue Air, Avanti Air and Ukraine International. Its main base was Abruzzo International Airport, Pescara. It closed in 2012.

Destinations
On Air serves the following destinations from Pescara (summer 2011):

Bucharest (Aurel Vlaicu International Airport)

Crete (Chania Airport)

Paris (Paris-Charles de Gaulle Airport)

Prague (Prague Ruzyně Airport)

See also 
 List of defunct airlines of Italy

References

External links
On Air (Fly On Air, flyonair.it), archived version as of 18 September 2012

Italian companies established in 2006
Italian companies disestablished in 2012
Defunct airlines of Italy
Defunct European low-cost airlines
Airlines established in 2006
Airlines disestablished in 2012
2006 establishments in Italy
2012 disestablishments in Italy